Larvet Masunda (born 11 June 1995) is a Zimbabwean cricketer. He made his List A debut for Mashonaland Eagles in the 2017–18 Pro50 Championship on 30 April 2018.

References

External links
 

1995 births
Living people
Zimbabwean cricketers
Place of birth missing (living people)
Mashonaland Eagles cricketers